The 1956 World Table Tennis Championships women's singles was the 23rd edition of the women's singles championship.
Tomi Okawa defeated Kiiko Watanabe in the final by three sets to two, to win the title.

Results

See also
List of World Table Tennis Championships medalists

References

-
1956 in women's table tennis